A think tank, or policy institute, is a research institute that performs research and advocacy concerning topics such as social policy, political strategy, economics, military, technology, and culture. Most think tanks are non-governmental organizations, but some are semi-autonomous agencies within government or are associated with particular political parties, businesses or the military. Think-tank funding often includes a combination of donations from very wealthy people and those not so wealthy, with many also accepting government grants.

Think tanks publish articles and studies, and even draft legislation on particular matters of policy or society. This information is then used by governments, businesses, media organizations, social movements or other interest groups. Think tanks range from those associated with highly academic or scholarly activities to those that are overtly ideological and pushing for particular policies, with a wide range among them in terms of the quality of their research. Later generations of think tanks have tended to be more ideologically oriented. Modern think tanks began as a phenomenon in the United Kingdom in the 19th and early 20th centuries, with most of the rest being established in other English-speaking countries. Prior to 1945, they tended to focus on the economic issues associated with industrialization and urbanization. During the Cold War, many more American and other Western think tanks were established, which often guided government Cold War policy. Since 1991, more think tanks have been established in non-Western parts of the world. More than half of all think tanks that exist today were established after 1980.

This article lists global policy institutes according to continental categories and then sub-categories by country within those areas. These listings are not comprehensive; there are at least 11,175 think tanks around the world.

History 

According to historian Jacob Soll, while the term "think tank" is modern with its origin "traced to the humanist academies and scholarly networks of the 16th and 17th centuries." Soll writes that, "in Europe, the origins of think tanks go back to the 800s when emperors and kings began arguing with the Catholic Church about taxes. A tradition of hiring teams of independent lawyers to advise monarchs about their financial and political prerogatives against the church spans from Charlemagne all the way to the 17th century, when the kings of France were still arguing about whether they had the right to appoint bishops and receive a cut of their income." The Club de l'Entresol, active in Paris between 1723 and 1731, was another prominent example of an early independent think tank focusing on public policy and current affairs, especially economics and foreign affairs.

Several major current think tanks were founded in the 19th century. The Royal United Services Institute was founded in 1831 in London, and the Fabian Society in 1884. The oldest American think tank, the Carnegie Endowment for International Peace, was founded in Washington, D.C., in 1910 by philanthropist Andrew Carnegie. Carnegie charged trustees to use the fund to "hasten the abolition of international war, the foulest blot upon our civilization." The Brookings Institution was founded shortly thereafter in 1916 by Robert S. Brookings and was conceived as a bipartisan "research center modeled on academic institutions and focused on addressing the questions of the federal government."

After 1945, the number of policy institutes increased, with many small new ones forming to express various issues and policy agendas. Until the 1940s, most think tanks were known only by the name of the institution. During the Second World War, think tanks were often referred to as "brain boxes".

Before the 1950s, the phrase "think tank" did not refer to organizations.  From its first appearances in the 1890s up to the 1950s, the phrase was most commonly used in American English to colloquially and pejoratively refer to the human brain itself when commenting on an individual's failings (in the sense that something was wrong with that person's "think tank").  Around 1958, the first organization to be regularly described in published writings as "the Think Tank" (note the capitalization and the use of the definite article) was the Center for Advanced Study in the Behavioral Sciences.  However, the Center does not count itself as and is not perceived to be a think tank in the contemporary sense.  During the 1960s, the phrase "think tank" was attached more broadly to meetings of experts, electronic computers,  and independent military planning organizations.   The prototype and most prominent example of the third category was the RAND Corporation, which was founded in 1946 as an offshoot of Douglas Aircraft and became an independent corporation in 1948.  In the 1970s, the phrase became more specifically defined in terms of RAND and its ilk.  During the 1980s and 1990s, the phrase evolved again to arrive at its broader contemporary meaning of an independent public policy research institute.

For most of the 20th century, such institutes were found primarily in the United States, along with much smaller numbers in Canada, the UK, and Western Europe. Although think tanks had also existed in Japan for some time, they generally lacked independence, having close associations with government ministries or corporations. There has been a veritable proliferation of "think tanks" around the world that began during the 1980s as a result of globalization, the end of the Cold War, and the emergence of transnational problems. Two-thirds of all the think tanks that exist today were established after 1970 and more than half were established since 1980.

The effect of globalisation on the proliferation of think tanks is most evident in regions such as Africa, Eastern Europe, Central Asia, and parts of Southeast Asia, where there was a concerted effort by other countries to assist in the creation of independent public policy research organizations. A survey performed by the Foreign Policy Research Institute's Think Tanks and Civil Societies Program underscores the significance of this effort and documents the fact that most of the think tanks in these regions have been established since 1992. , there were more than 4,500 of these institutions worldwide. Many of the more established think tanks, having been created during the Cold War, are focused on international affairs, security studies, and foreign policy.

Types 
Think tanks vary by ideological perspectives, sources of funding, topical emphasis and prospective consumers. Funding may also represent who or what the institution wants to influence; in the United States, for example, "Some donors want to influence votes in Congress or shape public opinion, others want to position themselves or the experts they fund for future government jobs, while others want to push specific areas of research or education."

A new trend, resulting from globalization, is collaboration between policy institutes in different countries. For instance, the Carnegie Endowment for International Peace operates offices in Washington, D.C., Beijing, Beirut, Brussels and Moscow.

The Think Tanks and Civil Societies Program (TTCSP) at the University of Pennsylvania, led by James McGann, annually rates policy institutes worldwide in a number of categories and presents its findings in the Global Go-To Think Tanks rating index. However, this method of the study and assessment of policy institutes has been criticized by researchers such as Enrique Mendizabal and Goran Buldioski, Director of the Think Tank Fund, assisted by the Open Society Institute.

Advocacy
In some cases, corporate interests, military interests and political groups have found it useful to create policy institutes, advocacy organizations, and think tanks. For example, The Advancement of Sound Science Coalition was formed in the mid-1990s to dispute research finding an association between second-hand smoke and cancer. Military contractors may spend a portion of their tender on funding pro-war think tanks. According to an internal memorandum from Philip Morris Companies referring to the United States Environmental Protection Agency (EPA), "The credibility of the EPA is defeatable, but not on the basis of ETS [environmental tobacco smoke] alone,... It must be part of a larger mosaic that concentrates all the EPA's enemies against it at one time."

According to the progressive media watchdog Fairness & Accuracy in Reporting, both left-wing and right-wing policy institutes are often quoted and rarely identified as such. The result is that think tank "experts" are sometimes depicted as neutral sources without any ideological predispositions when, in fact, they represent a particular perspective. In the United States, think tank publications on education are subjected to expert review by the National Education Policy Center's "Think Twice" think tank review project.

A 2014 New York Times report asserted that foreign governments buy influence at many United States think tanks. According to the article: "More than a dozen prominent Washington research groups have received tens of millions of dollars from foreign governments in recent years while pushing United States government officials to adopt policies that often reflect the donors' priorities."

Global think tanks

African think tanks

Ghana 
Ghana's first president, Kwame Nkrumah, set up various state-supported think tanks in the 1960s. By the 1990s, a variety of policy research centers sprang up in Africa set up by academics who sought to influence public policy in Ghana.

One such think tank was The Institute of Economic Affairs, Ghana, which was founded in 1989 when the country was ruled by the Provisional National Defence Council. The IEA undertakes and publishes research on a range of economic and governance issues confronting Ghana and Sub-Saharan Africa.  It has also been involved in bringing political parties together to engage in dialogue. In particular it has organised Presidential debates every election year since the Ghanaian presidential election, 1996.

Notable think tanks in Ghana include:
IMANI Centre for Policy and Education
 The Institute of Economic Affairs, Ghana (IEA)

Morocco 
 AMAQUEN, founded in 2003, is a think tank in the field of education through its publications (rapports), international scientific journal The Journal of Quality in Education, and international events (CIMQUSEF).

Somalia 
 Heritage Institute for Policy Studies
 Puntland Development Research Center

South Africa 
 Electoral Institute for Sustainable Democracy in Africa
 Free Market Foundation
 FW de Klerk Foundation
 Helen Suzman Foundation
 Institute for Democratic Alternatives in South Africa (IDASA)
 Institute for Justice and Reconciliation
 Institute for Security Studies
 South African Institute of International Affairs (SAIIA)
 South African Institute of Race Relations

Asian think tanks

Afghanistan 
Afghanistan has a number of think tanks that are in the form of governmental, non-governmental, and corporate organizations.

Afghanistan Analysts Network
Afghanistan Public Policy Research Organization
Centre for Conflict and Peace Studies

Bangladesh 
Bangladesh has a number of think tanks that are in the form of governmental, non-governmental, and corporate organizations.

 Bangladesh Institute of Development Studies (BIDS)
 Bangladesh Institute of Law and International Affairs (BILIA)
 Bangladesh Institute of Peace and Security Studies (BIPSS)
 Centre for Policy Dialogue (CPD)
 International Growth Centre (IGC)
 Making Our Economy Right (MOER)
 Bangladesh Institute of Labour Studies (BILS)
 Research and Policy Integration for Development (RAPID)

China 
In the People's Republic of China a number of think tanks are sponsored by governmental agencies such as Development Research Center of the State Council, but still retain sufficient non-official status to be able to propose and debate ideas more freely. In January 2012, the first non-official think tank in China, South Non-Governmental Think-Tank, was established in the Guangdong province. In 2009 the China Center for International Economic Exchanges was founded.

Hong Kong 
In Hong Kong, early think tanks established in the late 1980s and early 1990s focused on political development, including the first direct Legislative Council members election in 1991 and the political framework of "One Country, Two Systems", manifested in the Sino-British Joint Declaration. After the transfer of sovereignty to China in 1997, more think tanks were established by various groups of intellectuals and professionals. They have various missions and objectives including promoting civic education; undertaking research on economic, social and political policies; and promoting "public understanding of and participation in the political, economic, and social development of the Hong Kong Special Administrative Region".

Think tanks in Hong Kong include:
Bauhinia Foundation Research Centre
Business and Professionals Federation of Hong Kong
Central Policy Unit
Civic Exchange
The Global Institute for Tomorrow
HKGolden50
Hong Kong Christian Industrial Committee
Hong Kong Democratic Foundation
Hong Kong People's Council on Housing Policy
The Lion Rock Institute
New Century Forum
Our Hong Kong Foundation
One Country Two Systems Research Institute
Path of Democracy
Policy Innovation and Co-ordination Unit
Professional Commons

India 
India has the world's second-largest number of think tanks. Most are based in New Delhi, and a few are government-sponsored. There are few think tanks that promote environmentally responsible and climate resilient ideas like Centre for Science and Environment, Centre for Policy Research and World Resources Institute. There are other prominent think tanks like Observer Research Foundation, Tillotoma Foundation and Centre for Civil Society.

In Mumbai, Strategic Foresight Group is a global think tank that works on issues such as Water Diplomacy, Peace and Conflict and Foresight (futures studies). Think tanks with a development focus include those like the National Centre for Cold-chain Development ('NCCD'), which serve to bring an inclusive policy change by supporting the Planning Commission and related government bodies with industry-specific inputs – in this case, set up at the behest of the government to direct cold chain development. Some think tanks have a fixed set of focus areas and they work towards finding out policy solutions to social problems in the respective areas.

Initiatives such as National e-Governance Plan (to automate administrative processes) and National Knowledge Network (NKN) (for data and resource sharing amongst education and research institutions), if implemented properly, should help improve the quality of work done by think tanks.

Think tanks in India are growing across the length and breadth of the country as they are no longer limited to metro cities. Think tanks for the young, like RisingIndia ThinkTank, have emerged from one of the smallest city in Rajasthan state of India.

Indonesia 

 Centre for Strategic and International Studies
 Setara Institute

Iraq 
Over 50 think tanks have emerged in Iraq, particularly in the Kurdistan Region. Iraq's leading think tank is the Middle East Research Institute (MERI), based in Erbil.  MERI is an independent non-governmental policy research organization, established in 2014 and publishes in English, Kurdish, and Arabic.  It was listed in the global ranking by the United States's Lauder Institute of the University of Pennsylvania as 46th in the Middle East.

Israel 
There are many think tank teams in Israel, including:

 Shaharit - Creating Common Cause
 Jerusalem Institute for Market Studies (JIMS)
 Reut Institute
 Israel Council on Foreign Relations
 The Jerusalem Center for Public Affairs
 Adva Center
 Israel Democracy Institute
 Jerusalem Institute for Policy Research
 Myers-JDC-Brookdale Institute
 Floersheimer Studies at the Hebrew University of Jerusalem
 Harry S. Truman Research Institute for the Advancement of Peace, The Hebrew University of Jerusalem
 International Institute for Counter-Terrorism – IDC Herziliya
 Israel Center for Third Sector Research, Ben Gurion University of the Negev
 IPCRI – Israel/Palestine Center for Research and Information
 The Milken Institute
 Moshe Dayan Center for Middle Eastern and African Studies, Tel Aviv University
 The Begin-Sadat Center – Bar Ilan University
 The Center for the Study of Philanthropy in Israel at the Hebrew University of Jerusalem
 Israel Institute for Advanced Studies at the Hebrew University of Jerusalem
 The Jewish Arab Center (JAC), University of Haifa
 The Jewish People Policy Institute (JPPI)
 The Shalem Center
 Institute for National Security Studies, affiliated with Tel Aviv University.

Japan 
Japan has over 100 think tanks, most of which cover not only policy research but also economy, technology and so on. Some are government related, but most of the think tanks are sponsored by the private sector.
 Asian Development Bank Institute
 Central Research Institute of Electric Power Industry
 Genron NPO
 Global Industrial and Social Progress Research Institute
 Institute for International Monetary Affairs
 Institute of Developing Economies
 The International Academic Forum
 Japan Center for International Exchange
 Japan Institute for National Fundamentals
 Japan Institute of International Affairs
 Mitsubishi Research Institute
 National Institute for Research Advancement
 Rousoukai
 Shōwa Kenkyūkai
 Tokyo Foundation

Kazakhstan 
Institute of World Economics and Politics (IWEP) at the Foundation of the First President of the Republic of Kazakhstan was created in 2003. IWEP activities aimed at research problems of the world economy, international relations, geopolitics, security, integration and Eurasia, as well as the study of the First President of the Republic of Kazakhstan and its contribution to the establishment and strengthening of Kazakhstan as an independent state, the development of international cooperation and the promotion of peace and stability.

The Kazakhstan Institute for Strategic Studies under the President of the RK (KazISS) was established by the Decree of the President of RK on 16 June 1993. Since its foundation the main mission of the Kazakhstan Institute for Strategic Studies under the President of the Republic of Kazakhstan, as a national think tank, is to maintain analytical and research support for the President of Kazakhstan.

Malaysia 
Most Malaysian think tanks are related either to the government or a political party. Historically they focused on defense, politics and policy. However, in recent years, think tanks that focus on international trade, economics, and social sciences have also been founded.

Notable think tanks in Malaysia include:

Academy of Sciences Malaysia (ASM)
Institute for Democracy and Economic Affairs (IDEAS)
Institute for Pioneering of Education and Economic Excellence (INSPIRE)
Maritime Institute of Malaysia (MIMA)
Jauhar Academy of Social Sciences (JASS)
Jeffrey Cheah Institute on Southeast Asia (JCI)
Malaysian Industry-Government Group for High Technology (MIGHT)
Islamic Renaissance Front (IRF)

Pakistan 

Pakistan's think tanks mainly revolve around social policy, internal politics, foreign security issues, and regional geo-politics. Most of these are centered on the capital, Islamabad. One such think tank is the Sustainable Development Policy Institute (SDPI), which focuses on policy advocacy and research particularly in the area of environment and social development. 

Another policy research institute based in Islamabad is the Institute of Social and Policy Sciences (I-SAPS) which works in the fields of education, health, disaster risk reduction, governance, conflict and stabilization. Since 2007 - 2008, I-SAPS has been analyzing public expenditure of federal and provincial governments.

Philippines 
Think tanks in the Philippines could be generally categorized in terms of their linkages with the national government. Several were set up by the Philippine government for the specific purpose of providing research input into the policy-making process.

Sri Lanka 
Sri Lanka has a number of think tanks that are in the form of governmental, non-governmental and corporate organizations.
The Lakshman Kadirgamar Institute of International Relations and Strategic Studies is a policy-studies institute that is often referred to as a think tank.
LIRNEasia is a think tank working across the Asia-Pacific on regulatory and policy issues. Their main focus is the ICT sector, although they do work in other sectors, such as agriculture and health, which can benefit from ICT.
Verité Research is an interdisciplinary think tank in Colombo.

Singapore 
There are several think tanks in Singapore that advise the government on various policies and as well as private ones for corporations within the region. Many of them are hosted within the local public educational institutions.

Among them are the Singapore Institute of International Affairs (SIIA), Institute of Southeast Asian Studies (ISEAS), and the S. Rajaratnam School of International Studies.

Taiwan
In 2017 Taiwan had 58 think tanks. As in most countries there is a mix of government- and privately-funded think tanks.

Taiwanese think tanks in alphabetical order:
 Chung-Hua Institution for Economic Research
 Institute for National Defense and Security Research
 Prospect Foundation
 Taiwan Asia Exchange Foundation
 Taiwan Competitiveness Forum
 Taiwan Foundation for Democracy
 Taiwan Institute of Economic Research

Thailand 
Thailand Development Research Institute
iLaw

United Arab Emirates 
The UAE has been a center for political oriented think tanks which concentrate on both regional and global policy. Notable think tank have emerged in the global debate on terrorism, education & economical policies in the MENA region. Think tanks include:

Al Mesbar Studies and Research Centre
Dubai Economic Council
Gulf Research Center
Orient Research Centre

Uzbekistan 
 CED – Center for Economic Development (Центр Содействия Экономическому Развитию) is a think tank whose major tasks are: analytic support in economic reforming and development in Uzbekistan; improving knowledge and skills of the subjects of economic development;  assistance in productive dialogue between the government, civil society and private sectors on the economic development matters.
Key projects: Preparation of the National human development report for Uzbekistan, Sociological "portrait" of the Uzbek businessman, Preparation of an analytical report on export procedures optimization in Uzbekistan,
various industry and marketing researches in Uzbekistan, Tajikistan, and Turkmenistan.

Oceanian think tanks

Australia 
Most Australian think tanks are based at universities – for example, the Melbourne Institute – or are government-funded – for example, the Productivity Commission or the CSIRO.

Private sources fund about 20 to 30 "independent" Australian think tanks. The best-known of these think tanks play a much more limited role in Australian public and business policy-making than do their equivalents in the United States. However, in the past decade the number of think tanks has increased substantially. Prominent Australian conservative think tanks include the Centre for Independent Studies, the Sydney Institute and the Institute of Public Affairs. Prominent leftist Australian think tanks include the McKell Institute, Per Capita, the Australia Institute, the Lowy Institute and the Centre for Policy Development. In recent years regionally-based independent and non-partisan think tanks have emerged. 

Some think tanks, such as the Illawarra's i-eat-drink-think, engage in discussion, research and advocacy within a broader civics framework. Commercial think tanks like the Gartner Group, Access Economics, the Helmsman Institute, and others provide additional insight which complements not-for-profit organisations such as CEDA, the Australian Strategic Policy Institute, and the Australian Institute of Company Directors to provide more targeted policy in defence, program governance, corporate governance and similar.

Listed in alphabetical order, think tanks based in Australia include:

 Air Power Australia
 Asia Education Foundation
 Asialink
 The Australia Institute
 Australian Fabian Society
 Australian Institute of International Affairs
 Australian Institute of Policy & Science
 Australian Strategic Policy Institute
 The Brisbane Institute
 Centre for Independent Studies
 Centre for Policy Development
 Chifley Research Centre
 Committee for Economic Development of Australia
 Consumer Policy Research Centre (CPRC)
 Crowther Centre for Learning and Innovation
 Development Policy Centre
 Doctors Reform Society of Australia
 Evatt Foundation
 Grattan Institute
 H. R. Nicholls Society
 Infrastructure Partnerships Australia
 Institute for Economics and Peace
 Institute of Public Affairs
 International Energy Centre
 International WaterCentre
 Issues Deliberation Australia/America
 Laboratory for Visionary Architecture
 Lowy Institute for International Policy
 Mannkal Economic Education Foundation
 The Green Institute
 The McKell Institute
 The Melbourne Institute of Applied Economic and Social Research
 Menzies Research Centre
 National Civic Council
 New South Wales Institute for Educational Research
 Per Capita
 Samuel Griffith Society
 Strategic and Defence Studies Centre
 Sydney Institute
 Transport and Logistics Centre
 United States Studies Centre
 Western Australia Policy Forum

New Zealand

Think tanks based in New Zealand include:

 Centre for Strategic Studies New Zealand
 Child Poverty Action Group (Aotearoa New Zealand)
 Helen Clark Foundation
 Maxim Institute
 McGuinness Institute
 Motu Economic and Public Policy Research
 New Zealand Centre for Global Studies 
 New Zealand Initiative
 New Zealand Institute of Economic Research

European think tanks

Belgium 
Brussels hosts most of the European Institutions, hence a large number of international think tanks are based there. Notable think tanks are Bruegel, the Centre for European Policy Studies (CEPS), Centre for the New Europe (CNE), the European Centre of International Political Economy (ECIPE), the European Policy Centre (EPC), the Friends of Europe, the Global Governance Institute (GGI), Liberales, and Sport and Citizenship, among others.

Bulgaria 
Bulgaria has a number of think tanks providing expertise and shaping policies, including Institute of Modern Politics.

Czech Republic 
 The European Values Think-Tank
 The Prague Security Studies Institute (PSSI)

Denmark 
 CEPOS is a classic liberal/free-market conservative think tank in Denmark.

Finland 
Finland has several small think tanks that provide expertise in very specific fields. Notable think tanks include:

 Åland Islands Peace Institute
 Demos Helsinki
 European Centre of Excellence for Countering Hybrid Threats (Hybrid CoE)
 Crisis Management Initiative (CMI)
 Research Institute of the Finnish Economy (Etla)
 Finnish Institute of International Affairs
In addition to specific independent think tanks, the largest political parties have their own think tank organizations. This is mainly due to support granted by state for such activity. The corporate world has focused their efforts to central representative organization Confederation of Finnish Industries, which acts as think tank in addition to negotiating salaries with workers unions. Furthermore, there is the Finnish Business and Policy Forum (Elinkeinoelämän valtuuskunta, EVA). Agricultural and regional interests, associated with The Central Union of Agricultural Producers and Forest Owners (Maa- ja metsätaloustuottajain Keskusliitto, MTK) and the Centre Party, are researched by Pellervo Economic Research (Pellervon taloustutkimus, PTT). The Central Organisation of Finnish Trade Unions (Suomen Ammattiliittojen Keskusjärjestö, SAK) and the Social Democratic Party are associated with the Labour Institute for Economic Research (Palkansaajien tutkimuslaitos, PT). The Finns Party established its own think tank, Suomen Perusta, in 2012. Each of these organizations often release forecasts concerning the national economy.

France 
The French Institute of International Relations (IFRI) was founded in 1979 and is the third oldest think tank of western Europe, after Chatham House (UK, 1920) and the Stockholm International Peace Research Institute (Sweden, 1960). The primary goals of IFRI are to develop applied research in the field of public policy related to international issues, and foster interactive and constructive dialogue between researchers, professionals, and opinion leaders. France also hosts the European Union Institute for Security Studies (EUISS), a Paris-based agency of the European Union and think tank researching security issues of relevance for the EU. There are also a number of pro-business think tanks, notably the Paris-based Fondation Concorde. The foundation focuses on increasing the competitiveness of French SME's and aims to revive entrepreneurship in France.

On the left, the main think tanks in France are the Fondation Jean-Jaurès, which is organizationally linked to the French Socialist Party, and Terra Nova. Terra Nova is an independent left-leaning think tank, although it is nevertheless considered to be close to the Socialists. It works on producing reports and analyses of current public policy issues from a progressive point of view, and contributing to the intellectual renewal of social democracy.

The only French Think Tank mentioned in the "think tanks to watch" list of the 2014 Global Go To Think Tank Index Report  is a French think tank created by Gaspard Koenig in 2013, independent from all political parties, which aims at promoting freedoms in France, in terms of fundamental rights, economics and societal issues. GenerationLibre is described as being able to connect to the right on pro business freedom and regulations issues but also to the left on issues such as basic income, gay marriage and the legalization of marijuana.

Germany 
In Germany all of the major parties are loosely associated with research foundations that play some role in shaping policy, but generally from the more disinterested role of providing research to support policymakers than explicitly proposing policy. These include the Konrad-Adenauer-Stiftung (Christian Democratic Union-aligned), the Friedrich-Ebert-Stiftung (Social Democratic Party-aligned),  the Hanns-Seidel-Stiftung (Christian Social Union-aligned), the Heinrich-Böll-Stiftung (aligned with the Greens), Friedrich Naumann Foundation (Free Democratic Party-aligned) and the Rosa Luxemburg Foundation (aligned with Die Linke).

The German Institute for International and Security Affairs is a foreign policy think tank. Atlantic Community is an independent, non-partisan and non-profit organization set up as a joint project of Atlantische Initiative e.V. and Atlantic Initiative United States. The Institute for Media and Communication Policy deals with media-related issues. Transparency International is a think tank on the role of corporate and political corruption in international development.

Greece 

In Greece there are many think tanks, also called research organisations or institutes.

Ireland 

 The Economic and Social Research Institute (ESRI) is an independent research institute in Dublin, Ireland. Its research focuses on Ireland's economic and social development to inform policy-making and societal understanding.
 The Institute of International and European Affairs (IIEA) focuses on European and International affairs.
 The Iona Institute is a conservative, Catholic think tank.
 TASC (Think tank for Action on Social Change) is an Irish left-wing think tank.
 Transhuman Corporation is a research think tank that focuses on cyber and technology development.

Italy 
 Bruno Leoni Institute
 Future Italy
 ISPI – Italian Institute for International Political Studies
 Istituto Affari Internazionali
 Trinità dei Monti

Latvia 
While think tanks are not widespread in Latvia, as opposed to single-issue advocacy organizations, there are several noticeable institutions in the Latvian think tank landscape:
 The oldest think tank in Latvia is the Latvian Institute of International Affairs. LIIA is a non governmental and non partisan foundation, established in 1992, and their research and advocacy mainly focuses on Latvian foreign policy; Transatlantic relations; European Union policies, including its neighborhood policy and Eastern Partnership; and multilateral and bilateral relations with Russia.
 Centre for Public policy PROVIDUS is a non governmental and non partisan association, established in 2002.  Providus focuses their work (both research and advocacy) on topics especially relevant in transition and post-transition environments and Latvia in particular: good governance; criminal justice policy; tolerance and inclusive public policy and European policy.

Several think tanks are established and operate under the auspices of Universities, such as:
 Centre for European and transition studies is a think tank working under the auspices of the University of Latvia, the largest public university in the country. CETS was established in 2000.
 or Defense research centre in 1992 under the auspices of the National Academy of Defense.

Lithuania 
Vilnius Institute for Policy Analysis (VIPA) is an independent  non-governmental, non-profit, non-partisan policy think tank in Lithuania whose mission is to stand for the principles of open society, liberal democracy, rule of law and human rights.  VIPA acts via advocacy for strong and safe European Union, analyzing and advocating for anti-authoritarian, transparent, and open governance ideas in Central and Eastern Europe, is an opinion leader offering an alternative opinion to the public versus populism, radicalism, and authoritarian trends, reinforcing active citizens' participation in decision making, analyzing fake news, disinformation, and offering media literacy initiatives, putting forward solutions to improve the accountability, transparency, and openness of Lithuania's public sector, building a network of open society values oriented experts, civil activists and NGO's.

Netherlands 
All major political parties in the Netherlands have state-sponsored research foundations that play a role in shaping policy. The Dutch government also has its own think tank: the Scientific Council for Government Policy. The Netherlands furthermore hosts the Netherlands Institute of International Relations Clingendael, or Clingendael Institute, an independent think tank and diplomatic academy which studies various aspects of international relations.

Poland 
There is a large pool of think tanks in Poland on a wide variety of subjects. The oldest state-sponsored think tank is The Western Institute in Poznań (Polish: Instytut Zachodni). The second oldest is the Polish Institute of International Affairs (PISM) established in 1947. Another notable state-sponsored think tank is the Centre for Eastern Studies (OSW), which specializes in the countries neighboring Poland and in the Baltic Sea region, the Balkans, Turkey, the Caucasus and Central Asia. Among the private think tanks notable organizations include the Institute for Structural Research (IBS) on economic policy, The Casimir Pulaski Foundation on foreign policy, the Institute of Public Affairs (ISP) on social policy, and the Sobieski Institute.

Portugal 
Founded in 1970, the SEDES is one of the oldest Portuguese civic associations and think tanks. Contraditório think tank was founded in 2008. Contraditório is a non-profit, independent and non-partisan think tank.

Romania 
The Romanian Academic Society (SAR), founded in 1996, is a Romanian think tank for policy research.

Serbia 
The Foundation for the Advancement of Economics (FREN) was founded in 2005 by the Belgrade University's Faculty of Economics.

Slovakia 

Think tanks originating in Slovakia:

 GLOBSEC – Global think tank committed to enhancing security, prosperity and sustainability in Europe and throughout the world.
 Central European Labour Studies Institute or CELSI (Stredoeurópsky inštitút pre výskum práce in Slovak) – Central-european think tank which specializes in broadly defined labor issues, labour markets, and labor policy.
 Forum Minority Research Institute (Fórum Kisebbségkutató Intézet or Fórum Intézet in Hungarian and Fórum inštitút pre výskum menšín or Fórum inštitút in Slovak) – Think tank focusing on ethnic minorities living in Slovakia, especially Hungarians.

International think tanks with presence in Slovakia:

 Institute of Public Affairs (Inštitút pre verejné otázky or IVO in Slovak) – Australian-based think tank focusing on public policy issues.
 Open Society Foundations or OSF – US-based think thank with an aim of advancing justice, education, public health and independent media.
 Martens Centre (via the Anton Tunega Foundation) – Belgium-based think tank and political foundation of the European People's Party (EPP) which embodies a pan-European mindset and promotes Christian-democratic and liberal-conservative political values.

Spain 
The Elcano Royal Institute was created in 2001 following the example of the Royal Institute of International Affairs (Chatham House) in the UK, although it is closely linked to (and receives funding from) the government in power.

More independent but clearly to the left of the political spectrum are the Centro de Investigaciones de Relaciones Internacionales y Desarrollo (CIDOB) founded in 1973; and the Fundación para las Relaciones Internacionales y el Diálogo Exterior (FRIDE) established in 1999 by Diego Hidalgo and main driving force behind projects such as the Club de Madrid, a group of democratic former heads of state and government, the Foreign Policy Spanish Edition and DARA.

Former Prime Minister José Maria Aznar presides over the Fundación para el Analisis y los Estudios Sociales (FAES), a policy institute that is associated with the conservative Popular Party (PP). Also linked to the PP is the Grupo de Estudios Estratégicos (GEES), which is known for its defense- and security-related research and analysis. For its part, the Fundación Alternativas is independent but close to left-wing ideas. The Socialist Partido Socialista Obrero Español (PSOE) created Fundación Ideas in 2009 and dissolved it in January 2014. Also in 2009, the centrist Union, Progress and Democracy (UPyD) created Fundación Progreso y Democracia (FPyD).

Sweden 
Timbro is a free market think tank and book publisher based in Stockholm.

Switzerland 
Think tanks based within Switzerland include:
Avenir Suisse, founded in 1999 by fifteen of the largest Swiss companies. It is supported by over 130 companies to date.
DCAF, the Geneva Centre for the Democratic Control of Armed Forces, founded in 2000 to research security sector governance and reform.
Gottlieb Duttweiler Institute (GDI), conceived by the Migros-founder Gottlieb Duttweiler in 1946.
Horasis, which hosts the annual Horasis Global Meeting
Liberal Institute, founded in 1979.

Ukraine 
There are more than 100 registered think tanks in Ukraine. For example:

 Centre of Policy and Legal Reform (CPLR)
 Razumkov Centre is a non-governmental think tank founded in 1994. It carries out research of public policy in the following spheres: domestic policy; state administration; economic policy; energy; land relations; foreign policy; social policy; international and regional security; national security and defense.

United Kingdom 

In Britain, think tanks play a similar role to the United States, attempting to shape policy, and indeed there is some cooperation between British and American think tanks. For example, the London-based think tank Chatham House and the Council on Foreign Relations were both conceived at the Paris Peace Conference, 1919 and have remained sister organisations.

The Bow Group, founded in 1951, is the oldest centre-right think tank and many of its members have gone on to serve as Members of Parliament or Members of the European Parliament. Past chairmen have included Conservative Party leader Michael Howard, Margaret Thatcher's longest-serving Cabinet Minister Geoffrey Howe, Chancellor of the Exchequer Norman Lamont and former British Telecom chairman Christopher Bland.

Since 2000, a number of influential centre right think tanks have emerged including Policy Exchange, Centre for Social Justice and most recently Onward.

Transcontinental countries (Asia-Europe)

Armenia 
According to a 2020 report, there are 32 think tanks or similar institutions in Armenia.

The government closed the Noravank Foundation, a government-affiliated think tank, in 2018 after almost two decades of operation. However, other think tanks continue to operate, include the Caucasus Institute, the Caucasus Research Resource Center-Armenia (CRRC-Armenia) (which publishes the "Caucasus Barometer" annual public opinion survey of the South Caucasus, the "Enlight" Public Research Center, and the AMBERD research center at the Armenian State University of Economics.

Azerbaijan 
According to research done by the University of Pennsylvania, there are a total of 12 think tanks in Azerbaijan.

The Center for Economic and Social Development, or CESD; in Azeri, Azerbaijan, İqtisadi və Sosial İnkişaf Mərkəzi (İSİM) is an Azeri think tank, non-profit organization, NGO based in Baku, Azerbaijan. The center was established in 2005. CESD focuses on policy advocacy and reform, and is involved with policy research and capacity building.

The Economic Research Center (ERC) is a policy-research oriented non-profit think tank established in 1999 with a mission to facilitate sustainable economic development and good governance in the new public management system of Azerbaijan. It seeks to do this by building favorable interactions between the public, private and civil society and working with different networks both in local (EITI NGO Coalition, National Budget Group,  Public Coalition Against Poverty, etc.) and international levels (PWYP, IBP, ENTO, ALDA, PASOS,  WTO NGO Network etc.).

The Center for Strategic Studies under the President of Azerbaijan is a governmental, non-profit think tank founded in 2007. It focusses on domestic and foreign policy.

Russia 
According to the Foreign Policy Research Institute, Russia has 112 think tanks, while Russian think tanks claimed four of the top ten spots in 2011's "Top Thirty Think Tanks in Central and Eastern Europe".

Notable Russian think tanks include:
 Analytical Center for the Government of the Russian Federation
 Carnegie Moscow Center
Institute for US and Canadian Studies
Institute of World Economy and International Relations
Moscow State Institute of International Relations

Turkey 
Turkish think tanks are relatively new. There are at least 20 think tanks in the country, both independent and supported by government. Many of them are sister organizations of political parties, universities or companies some are independent and others are supported by government. Most Turkish think tanks provide research and ideas, yet they play less important roles in policy making than American think tanks. Turksam, Tasam and the Journal of Turkish Weekly are the leading information sources.

The oldest and most influential think tank in Turkey is ESAM (The Center for Economic and Social Research) which was established in 1969 and has headquarters in Ankara. There are also branch offices of ESAM in Istanbul, Bursa, Konya and elsewhere. ESAM has strong international relationships, especially with Muslim countries and societies. Ideologically it performs policies, produces ideas and manages projects in parallel to Milli Görüş and also influences political parties and international strategies. The founder and leader of Milli Görüş, Necmettin Erbakan, was very concerned with the activities and brainstorming events of ESAM. In The Republic of Turkey, two presidents, four prime ministers, various ministers, many members of the parliament, and numerous mayors and bureaucrats have been members of ESAM. Currently the General Chairman of ESAM is Recai Kutan (former minister for two different ministries, former main opposition party leader, and founder and General Chairman of the Saadet Party).

The Turkish Economic and Social Studies Foundation (TESEV) is another leading think thank. Established in 1994, TESEV is an independent non-governmental think tank, analyzing social, political and economic policy issues facing Turkey. TESEV has raised issues about Islam and democracy, combating corruption, state reform, and transparency and accountability. TESEV serve as a bridge between academic research and policy-making. Its core program areas are democratization, good governance, and foreign policy.

Other notable Turkish think tanks are the International Strategic Research Organisation (USAK),  the Foundation for Political, Economic and Social Research (SETA), and the Wise Men Center for Strategic Studies (BİLGESAM).

North American think tanks

Canada 

Canada has many notable think tanks (listed in alphabetical order). Each has specific areas of interest with some overlaps.

 Asia Pacific Foundation of Canada
 Atlantic Institute for Market Studies
 Broadbent Institute
 C.D. Howe Institute
 Caledon Institute of Social Policy
 Canada West Foundation
 Canadian Centre for Policy Alternatives
 Canadian Global Affairs Institute
 Canadian Institute for Advanced Research
 Canadian International Council
 Canadian Policy Research Networks (disbanded)
 Canadian Tax Foundation
 Cardus
 Centre for International Governance Innovation
 Conference Board of Canada
 Council of Canadians
 Fraser Institute
 Frontier Centre for Public Policy
 Institute for Quantum Computing
 Institute for Research on Public Policy
 Institute on Governance
 International Institute for Sustainable Development
 International Policy Forum
 Montreal Economic Institute
 Mowat Centre for Policy Innovation
 National Citizens Coalition
 North-South Institute
 Parkland Institute
 Pembina Institute
 Perimeter Institute for Theoretical Physics
 Public Policy Forum

Mexico 
CIDAC – The Center of Research for Development (Centro de Investigación para el Desarrollo, Asociación Civil) is a not-for-profit think tank that undertakes research and proposes viable policy options for Mexico's economic and democratic development. The organization seeks to promote open, pluralistic debate pursuing: the Rule of Law & Democracy, market economics, social development, and strengthening Mexico-United States relations.
CIDE – The Center of Research and Economics Teaching (Centro de Investigación y Docencia Económicas) is a think tank institute focussing on "public policies", "public choice", "democracy", and "economy".
COMEXI – The Mexican Council of International Affairs (Consejo Mexicano de Asuntos Internacionales).

United States 

As the classification is most often used today, the oldest American think tank is the Carnegie Endowment for International Peace, founded in 1910. The Institute for Government Research, which later merged with two organizations to form the Brookings Institution, was formed in 1916. Other early twentieth century organizations now classified as think tanks include the Hoover Institution (1919), The Twentieth Century Fund (1919, and now known as the Century Foundation), the National Bureau of Economic Research (1920), the Council on Foreign Relations (1921), and the Social Science Research Council (1923). The Great Depression and its aftermath spawned several economic policy organizations, such as the National Planning Association (1934), the Tax Foundation (1937), and the Committee for Economic Development (1943).

In collaboration with the Douglas Aircraft Company, the Air Force set up the RAND Corporation in 1946 to develop weapons technology and strategic defense analysis.

The Hudson Institute is a conservative American think tank founded in 1961 by futurist, military strategist, and systems theorist Herman Kahn and his colleagues at the RAND Corporation. Recent members include Mike Pompeo, the former secretary of state under Donald Trump who joined in 2021.

More recently, progressive and liberal think tanks have been established, most notably the Center for American Progress and the Center for Research on Educational Access and Leadership (CREAL). The organization has close ties to former United States President Barack Obama and other prominent Democrats.

Think tanks help shape both foreign and domestic policy. They receive funding from private donors, and members of private organizations. By 2013, the largest 21 think tanks in the US spent more than US$1 billion per year. Think tanks may feel more free to propose and debate controversial ideas than people within government. The progressive media watchdog Fairness and Accuracy in Reporting (FAIR) has identified the top 25 think tanks by media citations, noting that from 2006 to 2007 the number of citations declined 17%. The FAIR report reveals the ideological breakdown of the citations: 37% conservative, 47% centrist, and 16% liberal. Their data show that the most-cited think tank was the Brookings Institution, followed by the Council on Foreign Relations, the American Enterprise Institute, The Heritage Foundation, and the Center for Strategic and International Studies.

In 2016, in response to scrutiny about think tanks appearing to have a "conflict of interest" or lack transparency, executive vice president, Martin S. Indyk of Brookings Institution – the "most prestigious think tank in the world" admitted that they had "decided to prohibit corporations or corporate-backed foundations from making anonymous contributions." In August 2016, The New York Times published a series on think tanks that blur the line. One of the cases the journalists cited was Brookings, where scholars paid by a seemingly independent think tank "push donors' agendas amplifying a culture of corporate influence in Washington." For example, in exchange for hundreds of thousands of dollars the Brookings Institution provided Lennar – one of the United States' largest home builders – with a significant advantage in pursuing a US$8 billion revitalization project in Hunters Point, San Francisco. In 2014, Lennar's then-regional vice president in charge of the San Francisco revitalization, Kofi Bonner was named as a Brookings senior fellow – a position as 'trusted adviser' that carries some distinction. Bruce Katz, a Brookings vice president, also offered to help Lennar "engage with national media to develop stories that highlight Lennar's innovative approach."

U.S. Government think tanks 
Government think tanks are also important in the United States, particularly in the security and defense field. These include the Center for Technology and National Security Policy at the National Defense University, the Center for Naval Warfare Studies at the Naval War College, and the Strategic Studies Institute at the U.S. Army War College.

The government funds, wholly or in part, activities at approximately 30 Federally Funded Research and Development Centers (FFRDCs). FFRDCs, are unique independent nonprofit entities sponsored and funded by the United States government to meet specific long-term technical needs that cannot be met by any other single organization. FFRDCs typically assist government agencies with scientific research and analysis, systems development, and systems acquisition. They bring together the expertise and outlook of government, industry, and academia to solve complex technical problems. These FFRDCs include the RAND Corporation, the MITRE Corporation, the Institute for Defense Analyses, the Aerospace Corporation, the MIT Lincoln Laboratory, and other organizations supporting various departments within the United States Government.

Similar to the above quasi-governmental organizations are Federal Advisory Committees. These groups, sometimes referred to as commissions, are a form of think tank dedicated to advising the US Presidents or the Executive branch of government. They typically focus on a specific issue and as such, might be considered similar to special interest groups. However, unlike special interest groups these committees have come under some oversight regulation and are required to make formal records available to the public. As of 2002, about 1,000 of these advisory committees were described in the FACA searchable database.

South American think tanks 
Research done by Enrique Mendizabal shows that South American think tanks play various roles depending on their origins, historical development and relations to other policy actors. In this study, Orazio Bellettini from Grupo FARO suggests that they:

 Seek political support for policies.
 Legitimize policies – This has been clearer in Ecuador, Bolivia and Peru. New governments in Ecuador and Peru have approached policy institutes for support for already defined policies. In Bolivia, the government of Evo Morales has been working with Non-Government Organizations (NGOs) and other research institutes to do the same. However, in Chile, many think tanks during the 1990s seemed to endorse and maintain the legitimacy of policies implemented during the previous decade by the military dictatorship headed by Pinochet.
 Spaces of debate – In this case think tanks serve as sounding boards for new policies. In Chile, during the Pinochet dictatorship, many left wing intellectuals and researchers found 'asylum' in think tanks. In Ecuador, think tanks are seen as spaces where politicians can test the soundness of their policies and government plans.
 Financial channels for political parties or other interest groups – In Ecuador and Bolivia, German foundations have been able to provide funds to think tanks that work with certain political parties. This method has provided support to the system as a whole rather than individual CSOs.
 Expert cadres of policy-makers and politicians – In Peru after the end of the Fujimori regime, and in Chile after the fall of Pinochet, think tank staff left to form part of the new governments. In the United States, the role of major think tanks is precisely that: host scholars for a few months or years and then lose them to government employ.

How a policy institute addresses these largely depends on how they work, their ideology vs. evidence credentials, and the context in which they operate including funding opportunities, the degree and type of competition they have and their staff.

This functional method addresses the inherit challenge of defining a think tank. As Simon James said in 1998, "Discussion of think tanks...has a tendency to get bogged down in the vexed question of defining what we mean by 'think tank'—an exercise that often degenerates into futile semantics." It is better (as in the Network Functions Approach) to describe what the organisation should do. Then the shape of the organisation should follow to allow this to happen. The following framework (based on Stephen Yeo's description of think tanks' mode of work) is described in Enrique Mendizabal's blog "onthinktanks":

First, policy institutes may work in or base their funding on one or more of:

 Independent research: this would be work done with core or flexible funding that allows the researchers the liberty to choose their research questions and method. It may be long term and could emphasize 'big ideas' without direct policy relevance.  However, it could emphasize a major policy problem that requires a thorough research and action investment.
 Consultancy: this would be work done by commission with specific clients and addressing one or two major questions. Consultancies often respond to an existing agenda.
 Influencing/advocacy: this would be work done by communications, capacity development, networking, campaigns, lobbying, etc. It is likely to be based on research based evidence emerging from independent research or consultancies.

Second, policy institutes may base their work or arguments on:

 Ideology, values or interests
 Applied, empirical or synthesis research
 Theoretical or academic research

According to the National Institute for Research Advancement, a Japanese policy institute, think tanks are "one of the main policy actors in democratic societies ..., assuring a pluralistic, open and accountable process of policy analysis, research, decision-making and evaluation". A study in early 2009 found a total of 5,465 think tanks worldwide. Of that number, 1,777 were based in the United States and approximately 350 in Washington, DC, alone.

Argentina 
As of 2009, Argentina is home to 122 think tanks, many specializing in public policy and economics issues. Argentina ranks fifth in the number of these institutions worldwide.

Brazil 
Working on public policies, Brazil hosts, for example, Instituto Liberdade, a University-based Center at Tecnopuc inside the Pontifícia Universidade Católica do Rio Grande do Sul, located in the South Region of the country, in the city of Porto Alegre. Instituto Liberdade is among the Top 40 think tanks in Latin America and the Caribbean, according to the 2009 Global Go To Think Tanks Index a report from the University of Pennsylvania's Think Tanks and Civil Societies Program (TTCSP).

Fundação Getulio Vargas (Getulio Vargas Foundation (FGV)) is a Brazilian higher education institution. Its original goal was to train people for the country's public- and private-sector management. Today it hosts faculties (Law, Business, Economics, Social Sciences and Mathematics), libraries, and also research centers in Rio, São Paulo and Brasilia. It is considered by Foreign Policy magazine to be a top-five "policymaker think tank" worldwide.

The Igarapé Institute is a Brazilian think tank focusing on public, climate, and digital security.

Public opinion 
A poll by the British firm Cast From Clay found that only 20 percent of Americans trust think tanks.

See also 
 Collective intelligence
 Futurists
 Internet think tanks
 List of think tanks
 Lobbying
 Mass collaboration
 Mass communication
 Overton window
 School of thought
 Strategic studies
 TED (conference)

References

Further reading 

 Abelson, Donald E. Do Think Tanks Matter? Assessing the Impact of Public Policy Institutes. Montreal: McGill-Queen's University Press, 2002.
 Arin, Kubilay Yado: Think Tanks, the Brain Trusts of US Foreign Policy. Wiesbaden: VS Springer 2013.
 Boucher, Stephen, et al., Europe and its think tanks; a promise to be fulfilled. An analysis of think tanks specialised in European policy issues in the enlarged European Union, Studies and Research No 35, October, Paris, Notre Europe, 2004 PDF
 Cockett, Richard, Thinking the unthinkable: think tanks and the economic counter revolution; 1931–1983, London: Fontana, 1995.
 
 Dickson, Paul. "Think Tanks". New York: Ballantine Books, 1972. 397 pages.
 Goodman, John C. "What is a Think Tank?" National Center for Policy Analysis, 2005.
 Fan, Maureen. "Capital Brain Trust Puts Stamp on the World", Washington Post (16 May 2005): B01.
 Patrick Dixon. Futurewise – Six Faces of Global Change – issues covered by Think Tanks and methodology for reviewing trends, impact on policy 2003): Profile Books
 Kelstrup, Jesper Dahl (2016): The Politics of Think Tanks in Europe. Abingdon & New York: Routledge.
 Lakoff, George. Moral Politics: What Conservatives Know That Liberals Don't. Chicago: University of Chicago Press, 1996.
 Ladi, Stella. Globalisation, Policy Transfer And Policy Research Institutes, Edward Elgar, 2005.
 McGann, James (2006) Comparative Think Tanks, Politics And Public Policy, Northampton, MA: Edward Elgar Publishing
 Mendizabal, Enrique and Kristen Sample (2009) "Dime a quien escuchas... Think Tanks y Partidos Politicos en America Latina", ODI/IDEA: Lima
 Medvetz, Thomas (2012) "Think Tanks in America ", Chicago, IL: University of Chicago Press.
 Phelps, Richard P. (2015). The Gauntlet: Think Tanks and Federal Research Centers Misrepresent and Suppress Other Education Research  New Educational Foundations, 4.
 Ranquet, Robert. Think Tanks and the National Security Strategy Formulation Process: A Comparison of Current American and French Patterns, 1997. PDF
 
 Smith, James. A. The Idea Brokers: Think Tanks and the Rise of the New Policy Elite, New York: The Free Press, 1991.
 Snider, J.H. "Strengthen Think Tank Accountability", Politico (3 February 2009). 
 Stone, Diane. Knowledge actors and transnational governance: The private-public policy nexus in the global agora. Palgrave Macmillan, 2013.
 
 Stone, Diane. Capturing the Political Imagination: Think Tanks and the Policy Process, London: Frank Cass, 1996
 
 Stone, Diane, and Andrew Denham, eds. Think Tank Traditions: Policy Research and the Politics of Ideas. Manchester: Manchester University Press, 2004.
 Struyk, Raymond J. Managing Think Tanks: Practical Guidance for Maturing Organizations, Budapest, Local Government and Public Service Reform Initiative Washington DC., Urban Institute 2002
 UNDP – United Nations Development Program. Thinking the Unthinkable, Bratislava, UNDP Regional Bureau for Europe and the Commonwealth of Independent States, 2003